Nepotism is an advantage, privilege, or position that is granted to relatives in an occupation or field. These fields may include but are not limited to, business, politics, academia, entertainment, sports, fitness, religion, and other activities. The term originated with the assignment of nephews to important positions by Catholic popes and bishops.

Nepotism has been criticized since the ancient times by several philosophers, including Aristotle, Valluvar, and Confucius, condemning it as both evil and unwise.

Origins 

The term comes from Italian word nepotismo, which is based on Latin root nepos meaning nephew. Since the Middle Ages and until the late 17th century, some Catholic popes and bishops – who had taken vows of chastity and, therefore, usually had no legitimate offspring of their own – gave their nephews such positions of preference as were often accorded by fathers to sons.

Several popes elevated nephews and other relatives to the cardinalate. Often, such appointments were a means of continuing a papal "dynasty". For instance, Pope Callixtus III, head of the Borgia family, made two of his nephews cardinals; one of them, Rodrigo, later used his position as a cardinal as a stepping stone to the papacy, becoming Pope Alexander VI. Alexander then elevated Alessandro Farnese, his mistress's brother, to cardinal; Farnese would later go on to become Pope Paul III.

Paul III also engaged in nepotism, appointing, for instance, two nephews, aged 14 and 16, as cardinals. The practice was finally limited when Pope Innocent XII issued the bull Romanum decet Pontificem, in 1692. The papal bull prohibited popes in all times from bestowing estates, offices, or revenues on any relative, with the exception that one qualified relative (at most) could be made a cardinal.

Mention in ancient literature
In the second book of the Kural literature, which forms a manual for governments and corporations, Valluvar suggests about nepotism and favouritism thus: "If you choose an unfit person for your job just because you love and you like him, he will lead you to endless follies." According to him, nepotism is both evil and unwise.

Types

Political 
Nepotism is a common accusation in politics when the relative of a powerful figure ascends to similar power seemingly without appropriate qualifications. The British English expression "Bob's your uncle" is thought to have originated when Robert Arthur Talbot Gascoyne-Cecil, 3rd Marquess of Salisbury, promoted his nephew, Arthur Balfour, to the esteemed post of Chief Secretary for Ireland, which was widely seen as an act of nepotism.

Organizational 
Nepotism in organizations leads to monopolization of power because when members involved in institutional decision-making are related, decisions made within institutions risk favoring a group of closely connected people.

Nepotism can also occur within organizations, when a person is employed due to their familial ties. It is generally seen as unethical, both on the part of the employer and employee. One of the consequences of nepotism in an organization is the creation of a limitation in the organization's network of contacts, reducing the opportunities for negotiation with other social circles, which can lead to a reduction in the success and duration of organizations in the long term.

In employment 
Nepotism at work can mean increased opportunity at a job, attaining a job or being paid more than other similarly situated people. Arguments are made both for and against employment granted due to a family connection, which is most common in small, family run businesses. On one hand, nepotism can provide stability and continuity. Critics cite studies that demonstrate decreased morale and commitment from non-related employees, and a generally negative attitude towards superior positions filled through nepotism. An article from Forbes magazine stated "there is no ladder to climb when the top rung is reserved for people with a certain name." Employing intimate people favors perpetuating the ideas or goals of those who employ them, knowing that the people around them will face up to them. However, it can lead to a lack of competent staff or a reduction in productivity because even if the employees are not the best options for their functions, they will be protected by those who employ them. Some businesses forbid nepotism as an ethical matter, considering it too troublesome and disruptive.

In entertainment
Outside of national politics, accusations of "nepotism" are made in instances of prima facie favoritism to relatives, in such cases as:
 Peaches Geldof's role as magazine editor in an MTV reality show – produced by a company owned by her father Bob Geldof.
 Tori Spelling's breakout role on Beverly Hills 90210 as a result of her father Aaron Spelling's involvement with the show.
 Hollywood's Coppola family includes many distinguished filmmakers and actors. The careers of Sofia Coppola, Nicolas Cage, and Jason Schwartzman have been attributed to aid by director Francis Ford Coppola, who cast his daughter Sofia in The Godfather Part III. Cage changed his last name to distance himself from such charges.
 Ben Platt's role as high schooler Evan Hansen in the 2021 film adaptation of the musical Dear Evan Hansen as a result of his winning the Tony Award for Best Actor in a Musical for originating the role on Broadway in 2016, as well as the involvement of his father, Marc Platt, as one of the film's producers. The latter was never involved on the producing team of the stage version. The casting sparked controversy due to Ben Platt being ten years older than his character at the time of filming, resulting in critics and viewers deeming him too old to reprise his role. He would go on to be nominated for two Golden Raspberry Awards, including Worst Actor, for his performance.
 New York magazine’s December 2022 cover featured notable celebrities (Maude Apatow, Lily-Rose Depp, Maya Hawke, Dakota Johnson, Ben Platt, Jack Quaid, Zoë Kravitz, and John David Washington) whose career successes have been achieved through nepotism.

In academia 
Nepotism is also frequent in academia where it is frequent for professors to have their partners, and sometimes children, hired by the same faculty in which they work. Countries with high levels of corruption and higher education systems with low competition between universities are generally have higher levels of corruption in academia. Italy has been noted for having particularly high levels of nepotism in its academic system, when compared to other developed nations.

Selected examples by country

Argentina 
In Argentina, nepotism is a very common practice. Although there have been various attempts of reducing it, it is difficult in a country where state jobs are used as a gratitude token or party favoritism.

Former president Mauricio Macri has been investigated for nepotism after allegedly extending a tax amnesty to their family.

The Kirchnerist party has openly stated the beliefs in nepotism, treating meritocracy as a pejorative concept. The government's ministries and secretariats are plagued with friends, family and militants of the current party leaders, many of which were criticized for being incapable in their jobs. This has been very evident during the Cristina Kirchner's presidencies (2007–2015) and Alberto Fernández presidency (2019–present).

Australia 
Shortly after his appointment as the Anglican Archbishop of Sydney in 2001, Peter Jensen was accused, in an Australian Broadcasting Corporation interview, of nepotism after nominating his brother Phillip Jensen as Dean of Sydney and appointing his wife Christine Jensen to an official position in the Sydney diocese.

Anna Bligh, who won the 2009 Queensland State election, has been accused of nepotism by giving her husband Greg Withers a position as the Office of Climate Change head.

Azerbaijan 
On 21 February 2017, President of Azerbaijan Ilham Aliyev created the position of Vice President of Azerbaijan, then appointed his wife Mehriban Aliyeva to the position. Since 1993, the presidency of Azerbaijan has always been in the hands of a member of the Aliyev family: in 1993, Heydar Aliyev was elected president of Azerbaijan, and after his death in a United States hospital in 2003, his son Ilham Aliyev became president and has been since then. His regime has been accused for a lack of democratic freedoms and press freedom.

Belgium 
Over the past decade, criticism has been growing over the creation of political dynasties in Belgium. This phenomenon has been explained by the fact that prominent party members control the ranking of candidates on party lists for elections and a candidate's place on a list determines who is elected. Another justification for the phenomenon is the importance of name recognition for collecting votes.

Claims of nepotism have been made against Bruno Tobback, the son of senator and former minister Louis Tobback, a member of the Flemish socialists, became the Belgian federal government's minister for the pensions and environment at 35 in 2005. Alexander De Croo, the son of former speaker of the Belgian parliament Herman De Croo, ran for the leadership of his father's party Open VLD at age 33. Finally there is the example of Maya Detiège, the daughter of former mayor of the city of Antwerp Leona Detiège, who herself is the daughter of the former mayor of Antwerp Frans Detiège.
Among other examples are former minister Freya Vandenbossche and senator Jean Jacques De Gucht, being the daughter and son of respectively former minister Luc Vandenbossche and former minister Karel De Gucht.

Cambodia 
Prime Minister Hun Sen and senior members of Parliament are known for their hand in getting family members into government positions. In the 2013 Cambodian parliamentary elections, at least eight candidates were sons of high-ranking Cambodian People's Party officials. All ruling party sons lost, but were eventually appointed into high-ranking government positions.

China 

For the past 3,000 years, nepotism has been common in China's clan and extended family based culture. Confucius wrote about the importance of balancing "filial piety with merit". The clan-based feudal system collapsed during Confucius' lifetime, yet nepotism has continued through the modern age.

France 
In October 2009, Jean Sarkozy, the second son of the President of the French Republic Nicolas Sarkozy, was poised to become the director of the major  authority despite lacking any higher education degree and professional experience. In 2008 he was voted regional councillor of Neuilly-sur-Seine, the town of which his father had previously been mayor.

In September 2009, rap-producer Pierre Sarkozy, the first son of then-President Nicolas Sarkozy, asked  for a financial contribution of around €10000 towards an €80000 artistic project. Because he was not a SCPP member, the request was automatically rejected. Pierre Sarkozy then went to the Élysée which led to an Élysée aide contacting the SCPP, and SCPP president Marc Guez assuring the issue would soon be favorably resolved. According to  president and SCPP member Yves Riesel, however, this would not happen as SCPP's financial help has been restricted to members only for months.

Greece
In Greece it is common practice for family members of current or former party leaders to be party members and get appointed as ministers when the party is in government. In addition, there have been three prime ministers from the Papandreou family, two from the Mitsotakis family (one currently serving), two from the Karamanlis family (a third one is currently serving as minister of transportation).

India 

Nepotism in India is common in politics, judiciary, business, the film industry, religious circles, and many other types of organizations.

Nepotism in Indian politics 
Since the 1980s, Indian politics has become dynastic, possibly due to the absence of elected party organization, independent civil society associations that mobilize support for a party, and centralized financing of elections. One example of dynastic politics has been the Nehru–Gandhi family which produced three Indian prime ministers. Family members have also led the Congress party for most of the period since 1978 when Indira Gandhi floated the then Congress(I) faction of the party. The ruling Bharatiya Janata Party also features several senior leaders who are dynasts. Dynastic politics is prevalent also in a number of political parties with regional presence such as All India Majlis-e-Ittehadul Muslimeen (AIMIM), Desiya Murpokku Dravida Kazhagam (DMDK), Dravida Munnetra Kazhagam (DMK), Indian National Lok Dal (INLD), Jammu & Kashmir National Conference (JKNC),  Jammu and Kashmir Peoples Democratic Party (JKPDP), Janata Dal (Secular) (JD(s)), Jharkhand Mukti Morcha (JMM), National People's Party (NPP), Nationalist Congress Party (NCP), Pattali Makkal Katchi (PMK), Rashtriya Janata Dal (RJD), Rashtriya Lok Dal (RLD), Samajwadi Party (SP), Shiromani Akali Dal (SKD), Shiv Sena (SS), Telangana Rashtra Samithi (TRS),Yuvajana Shramika Rythu Congress Party (YSRCP) and Telugu Desam Party (TDP).

Judiciary
Many judges and advocates of the high courts and the Supreme Court of India are alleged to be appointed by exercising casteism, nepotism, and favoritism, primarily due to the Supreme Court and the high court appointment process called Collegium which recommends to the President, in a legally binding manner, the names of judges to be appointed or promoted to the higher judiciary. The various judicial services exams are also infamous for these practices.

Indian film industry 
The Kapoor family, one of the most prolific generational families involved in Indian cinema, have been known for bringing their children into the industry with their endorsements and influence. In June 2020 a fresh debate on nepotism followed soon after the suicide of actor Sushant Singh Rajput, which fans believe was in reaction to efforts by Bollywood insiders to boycott him. Filmmaker Karan Johar, who Rajput had worked with in the Netflix film Drive, was quickly accused of nepotism by actress Kangana Ranaut, with Rajput's fans calling for a boycott of Johar and his studio, Dharma Productions, as well as of actor Salman Khan and his brothers, who were accused of bullying outsiders in the past. Actors and actresses Alia Bhatt, Varun Dhawan, Janhvi Kapoor, Ishaan Khatter, Ananya Pandey, Athiya Shetty, Tiger Shroff, Arjun Kapoor and Sara Ali Khan, all of whom hail from film families, were also widely criticized.

Indonesia
Suharto, Indonesia's second president, is involved in nepotism, alongside corruption and collusion (together, they are known as corruption, collusion, and nepotism ) (usually abbreviated to as KKN). Companies belonging to Suharto's children, particularly Siti Hardiyanti Rukmana ("Tutut"), Hutomo Mandala Putra ("Tommy"), and Bambang Trihatmodjo, were given lucrative government contracts and protected from market competition by monopolies. Examples include the toll-expressway company Jasamarga (monopolized by Tutut), the national car project Timor (monopolized by Bambang and Tommy), and the cinema market (monopolized by 21 Cineplex, which is owned by Suharto's cousin Sudwikatmono). Additionally, Suharto's family members received free shares in 1,251 of Indonesia's most lucrative domestic companies (mostly run by Suharto's ethnic-Chinese cronies), while foreign-owned companies were encouraged to establish "strategic partnerships" with the former Indonesian president's family companies.

Mauritius 

Nepotism is very common and very rampant in Mauritian politics, with many relatives and friends of high-ranking politicians being appointed high-ranking positions and associated companies being granted government contracts.

Since the first democratic elections in 1948, the field of politics in Mauritius has been marked by a handful of families who have controlled the four major political parties which exist to this day. They are often referred to as the "modern dynasties" of Mauritian politics such as the Duval, Bérenger, Curé, Uteem, Mohamed, Boolell, Ramgoolam and Jugnauth families. The Boolell family's involvement in politics started with Satcam Boolell in 1955, paving the way for his son Arvin Boolell, nephews Satish Boolell, Anil Gayan, and Sanjay Bhuckory, and son-in-law Sushil Kushiram to enter politics. The Duval dynasty started with ex-Lord mayor and minister Gaetan Duval, followed by his sons Xavier and Richard as well as grandson Adrien. Lall Jugnauth was the first of his clan to enter politics in the 1950s and was followed by his cousins Aneerood and Ashock as well as nephew Pravind. Abdool Razack Mohamed, who migrated from India in the 1930s, became Lord Mayor and minister; his son Yousuf and grandson Shakeel were also elected and served as ministers. Roshi Bhadain, who was a minister of the MSM government, is the nephew of former Labour Party minister Vasant Bunwaree. Roshi Bhadain and Akilesh Deerpalsing (Bhadain's advisor and campaign manager, who is also the son of former minister Kishore Deerpalsing), were investigated by ICAC in 2019 for suspicious recruitment practices when he was a minister.

In March 2020 Harry Ganoo, the retired brother of Minister Alan Ganoo, was nominated as the new president du Civil Service College Mauritius a few months after the November 2019 General Elections.

Until mid-2020, construction company PAD & Co. Ltd was awarded a string of major contracts such as constructing the new airport control tower, a new weather radar at Trou aux Cerfs, renovating the Bank of Mauritius, rehabilitating the coast line of Cap Malheurueux, renovating the Port Louis waterfront, upgrading roads, constructing the Harbour Cruise Terminal in Port Louis for the Mauritius Port Authority, and upgrading the navigation channels at Port Mathurin, Pointe La Gueule, and Baie aux Huîtres in Rodrigues, among other projects. PAD & Co. Ltd's owner, Alain Hao Thyn Voon, is the son of Philippe Hao Thyn Voon, president of the Olympic Committee, with very close ties to the MSM. Following the St Louis gate scandal and discovery of fake bank guarantees, PAD & Co. Ltd went under voluntary administration.

In June 2020, MP Eshan Juman revealed details of a contract between the Ministry of Land and Housing and a private firm called Smart Clinics Ltd. The firm is partly owned by MSM Parliamentary Private Secretary Ismaël Rawoo and his family. The contract was a lease of 60 years on 2 acres of prime beachfront state-owned land in Grande Rivière Noire, in the exclusive precinct of Tamarin in Black River. As part of the deal, Rawoo's family will acquire the lease for Rs 15.05 million and will onsell the lease for Rs 250 million, generating a profit of around Rs 235 million.

In August 2020, V. Gobin, a 75-year-old retired school teacher and father of Attorney General Maneesh Gobin, was nominated as Chairman of the Mahatma Gandhi Institute and the Rabindranath Tagore Institute. Maneesh Gobin was elected to Parliament within the ruling MSM government in 2014 and 2019 and his father V. Gobin was elected once in 1987. A week earlier, Rishikesh Hurdoyal, the brother of MSM Minister of Civil Service Vikram Hurdoyal, was nominated as chairman and President of the Mauritius Shipping Corporation Ltd, in addition to being a director of the State Bank of Mauritius. The new nomination will allow Rishikesh Hurdoyal to receive an extra Rs 54,540 per month, as well as an additional Rs 10,125 per month as entertainment allowance, with access to a chauffeured company car with 245 litres of fuel per month.

Nepotism under Anerood Jugnauth 
In May 1992, the Bank of Mauritius issued a Rs 20 note which featured the portrait of Sarojini Jugnauth, wife of Prime Minister Anerood Jugnauth. The portrait was considered to be a birthday gift from Anerood to his wife. This developed into a major controversy, which led to Anerood confirming in parliament that he had approved the issue of the new note. He apologised to the population and stated he would not commit such a mistake in the future.

Despite her defeat in the 2014 general elections, Maya Hanoomanjee became Speaker of the National Assembly, Sarojini Jugnauth's niece. In 2015, Maya's daughter Naila was appointed to the newly created position of CEO of the State Property Development Company. In 2018, she was also appointed as CEO of Landscope Mauritius, another state-owned corporation. Maya's other daughter, Sheila, was involved in a 2017 controversy, when it was revealed that her company was allocated the contract to supply biscuits to various state-owned organisations and municipal councils. The tins had misleading labels that read "Made in UK" when in fact they were produced by a local Mauritian baker.

In December 2015 Rita Venkatasawmy, niece of Sarojini Jugnauth, was nominated the Ombudsman For Children despite having no qualifications in the judiciary. Her predecessor Vidya Narayen was a retired judge who held the position from 2011. Prior to Judge Vidya Narayen the position was held from 2003 to 2011 by lawyer Shirin Aumeeruddy-Cziffra.

Soon after the retirement of Satyaved Seebaluck in 2016, Prime Minister Aneerood Jugnauth nominated his close relative Nayen Koomar Ballah as Head of the Civil Service and Secretary to Cabinet. Nayen Ballah is the cousin of Sarojini Jugnauth. In March 2018, Ballah was decorated with the title of Grand Order of the Star and Key of the Indian Ocean.

In 2017, several opposition MPs raised questions in the National Assembly about the business dealings of MSM Minister of Technology Yogida Sawmynaden's wife Wenda. It was revealed that the buyer of controversial clinic Apollo Bramwell had been pressured to use the services of notary public Wenda Sawmynaden, Yogida's wife. The private clinic had been valued at Rs 2 billion but was sold for only Rs 77 million. Despite the conflict of interest, Wenda pocketed fees worth Rs 7 million. In another instance political pressure was applied for SIT Property Development Ltd to host an emergency meeting for Wenda to be made the preferred notary public regarding the sale of parcels of prime real estate within a new gated community at Côte-d'Or. Wenda's brother Harry Krishna Vydelingum was also appointed as president of the Mauritius Institute of Training and Development following a failed attempt to make him part of the management board of Mauritius Post. Wenda was also allocated various contracts by various state-run corporations, such as NHDC, the Mauritius House Company, SICOM, the Sugar Investment Trust, the Sugar Industry Pension Fund Board, and various banks.

Nepotism under Navin Ramgoolam 
Following the electoral defeat of the Labour Party in 2014, ex-Prime Minister Navin Ramgoolam was arrested on suspicions of money laundering and conspiracy. A police raid of his house exposed several safes containing brand new bank notes to the value of Rs 220 million rupees, exclusive credit cards and prescription medication tablets. His girlfriend Nandanee Oogarah-Soornack, accompanied by his Xara, had escaped Mauritius to her castle in Italy a day before the proclamation of election results with an estimated Rs 800 million rupees. Attempts to extradite her back to Mauritius failed. Nandanee's rapid accumulation of wealth with the help of Ramgoolam was closely examined by the press and investigators, and it was revealed how she collected millions of rupees through companies set up as monopolies of food outlets at Sir Seewoosagur Ramgoolam International Airport.

After the December 2014 elections, the new government instigated criminal proceedings to recover about 1,000 acres (1,150 arpents) of state-owned land which had been allocated to the activists and allies of Ramgoolam under his Labour government since 2005. The principal recipients of the various lots of Crown land ranged from Labour activists to associates to corporations, and the land was used for varying purposes including resorts, restaurants, and houses. One recipient of the land, Sandranee Ramjoorawon's husband Rajiv Beeharry, was a trusted adviser of Navin Ramgoolam and was appointed as CEO of the state-owned MauBank. Labour Party Treasurer Deva Virahsawmy's company Midas Acropolis was also granted 31 arpents of Crown land at St-Félix after the Labour government cancelled the development permit previously awarded to a businessman from Réunion Island. Prior to the December 2014 elections the ministry held by Deva Virahsawmy approved the Environment Impact Assessment for land clearing of the 31 arpents in preparation of the development of a new hotel. Within the harbour precinct, state land was granted to Beta Cement, owned by Veekram Bhunjun, a relative of ex-minister Rajesh Jeetah. Bhunjun was also awarded 12.5 arpents at Petite-Rivière-Noire via his company Western Marina.

In 2008, a private company called Pride Bridge Limited was formed by Nandanee Soornack's father and his associates. Pride Bridge Ltd was soon granted 30 arpents of pas géométriques state-owned land at Poste de Flacq in 2008 for a "mixed development project" against a deposit of Rs 5 million. However the owners of the well-established estate Constance La Gaité objected against the proposed project by questioning its legality and six years later Soonack's and Chundunsing's company gave up the 30 arpents as Navin Ramgoolam was defeated in the 2014 elections, soon after which Nandanee Soornack fled to Italy.

Ramgoolam's sister Sunita Ramgoolam-Joypaul claimed and received more than Rs 3.1 million from the government as per diem for accompanying the then-PM's wife overseas. One of the visits was in September 2007 when she travelled to New York. Another costly visit was when Sunita Ramgoolam-Joypaul travelled to France in 2008. Veena Ramgoolam claimed and received more than Rs 6 million from the government for accompanying her husband overseas.

Malaysia 
The appointment of Nurul Izzah as a senior economic and finance advisor by Prime Minister Anwar Ibrahim resulted in accusations of nepotism. The action was widely criticized by intellectuals, NGOs and even members of Pakatan Harapan party, who claimed it contravened principles of merit and fairness.

Romania 
Romanian Communist dictator Nicolae Ceaușescu's family members "dominated" the country for decades. Elena Băsescu, the daughter of President Traian Băsescu, was elected in 2009 to the European Parliament, despite the fact that she had no significant professional or political experience.

Singapore 

Singapore's government has been the target of numerous charges of nepotism, with several members of the Prime Minister's family holding high ranking posts. Lee Kuan Yew, who was prime minister from 1959 to 1990, preceded his son Lee Hsien Loong. Other family members holding high positions include the elder Lee’s daughter, Lee Wei Ling, the director of the National Neurological Institute, his other son, Lee Hsien Yang, the chief executive officer of Singapore Telecommunications from 1995 to 2007 and the younger Lee's wife Ho Ching, who was appointed chief executive officer of state holding investment company Temasek Holdings. The family members dispute the charges as they arise.

Sri Lanka 

Former President of Sri Lanka, Mahinda Rajapaksa, has been accused of nepotism, appointing three brothers to run important ministries and giving out other political positions to relatives, regardless of their merit. During his presidency, the Rajapaksa family held the ministries of finance, defence, ports and aviation, and highways and road development. The president's brother, Gotabhaya Rajapaksa, was given the post of Defence Secretary. He also controlled the armed forces, the police and the Coast Guard, and was responsible for immigration and emigration. Rajapaksa appointed his brother Basil Rajapaksa as minister of Economic Development. Together, the Rajapaksa brothers controlled over 70% of Sri Lanka's public budget. Mahinda Rajapaksa's eldest brother, Chamal Rajapaksa, was appointed as the Speaker of the Parliament of Sri Lanka, and has held many other posts before, while his eldest son, Namal Rajapaksa, is also a member of the parliament and holds undisclosed portfolios.

Others include: his nephew, Shashindra Rajapaksa, who is the former Chief minister of Uva; one of his cousins, former Sri Lankan ambassador to the United States, Jaliya Wickramasuriya; and another cousin, Udayanga Weeratunga, who is the former ambassador to Russia. Dozens of nephews, nieces, cousins, and in-laws have also been appointed as heads of banks, boards, and corporations.

Chandrika Kumaratunga, who served as the former President of Sri Lanka from 1994 to 2005 and former Prime Minister of Sri Lanka in 1994, is the daughter of S. W. R. D. Bandaranaike and Sirimavo Bandaranaike who both served as Prime Ministers of Ceylon from 1956 to 1959, 1960 to 1965, 1970 to 1977 and 1994 to 2000. Her brother Anura Bandaranaike served as the Speaker of the Parliament of Sri Lanka from 2000 to 2001

Also, former president Ranasinghe Premadasa's son Sajith Premadasa is the Opposition leader of Sri Lanka who ran for presidential election in 2019 as well.

Also Ranil Wickremesinghe who served as prime minister of Sri Lanka from 1993 to 1994, 2001 to 2004, 2015 to 2018 and 2018 to 2019 is a nephew of former Sri Lankan president J. R. Jayewardene.  Also a defense state minister of his government Ruwan Wijewardene is also a cousin of Ranil Wickremesinghe. Also Ruwan is the great grandson of UNP founder and Sri Lanka's first Prime Minister D. S. Senanayake. Ruwan has been given a high priority in the party by Ranil by giving leadership roles.

Spain 
Nepotism occurred in Spanish Colonial America when offices were given to family members.

Juan Antonio Samaranch Salisachs, son of Juan Antonio Samaranch, president of the International Olympic Committee (IOC) from 1980 to 2001, has been a member of the International Olympic Committee since 2001, and his daughter, Maria Teresa Samaranch Salisachs, has been president of the Spanish Federation of Sports on Ice since 2005.

United Kingdom 
The Marquess of Salisbury, who was Prime Minister for three separate occasions from 1885 to 1902 for a total of approximately 14 years, appointed his nephew Arthur Balfour as Chief Secretary for Ireland in 1887 and later as Prime Minister in 1902. This is supposedly the origin of the phrase "Bob's your uncle".

In February 2010, Sir Christopher Kelly, chairman of the Committee on Standards in Public Life, said that more than 200 MPs used Parliamentary allowances to employ their own relatives in a variety of office roles. He suggested that the practice should be banned.

In 2005, Councillor Ann Reid of York arranged for all nine sets of traffic lights on her daughter Hannah's wedding route through York to be switched to green for the five-car convoy. As a result, the wedding party took only 10 minutes to pass through the city.

North Yorkshire Police's Chief Constable Grahame Maxwell was disciplined by the IPCC in 2011, but refused to resign, after admitting that he assisted a relative through the first stages of a recruitment process.

Many Northern Irish politicians employ family members. In 2008, 19 elected politicians of the Democratic Unionist Party (DUP) directly employed family members and relatives comprising 27 of its 136 staff.

Boris Johnson, the former Prime Minister was accused of nepotism for having appointed his brother Jo Johnson to the House of Lords, having previously also appointed him to his Cabinet as Minister of State for Universities, Science, Research and Innovation.

Jesse Norman is a British Conservative Party politician serving as Financial Secretary to the Treasury since 2019. He has personally endorsed the retrospective 2019 Loan Charge despite there being seven confirmed suicides linked to the charge, including one in which he was named. In 2020, Norman's wife, Kate Bingham was appointed chair of the UK's Vaccine Taskforce—the group set up to lead UK efforts to find and manufacture a COVID-19 vaccine—despite other more qualified people being proposed.

United States 
Palm Beach County, Florida schools reinforced nepotism rules as of 2012 to ensure an "equitable work environment".

In December 2012, a report from the Washington Post indicated various nepotism practices from the District of Columbia and Northern Virginia's Metropolitan Washington Airports Authority (MWAA), including one family with five members working for the MWAA. One of the reasons given by the associate general counsel to defend the alleged nepotism was "if [the employees are] qualified and competed for [the positions] on their own, I don't see a problem with relatives working in the same organization." The inspector general of the U.S. Department of Transportation and the U.S. Congress pressured the MWAA to resolve practices of nepotism. Authority employees are no longer allowed to directly or indirectly influence hiring or promotion of relatives, as documented in their ethics policy.

Politics 

President John Adams appointed his son John Quincy Adams as the first United States Minister to Prussia.

Around 30 family members or relatives of President Ulysses S. Grant prospered financially in some way from either government appointments or employment.

Franklin Roosevelt submitted the name of his son Elliott Roosevelt to the Senate for promotion to brigadier general.  Following threats of resignation and pressure, Elliott Roosevelt was made a rated pilot during World War II.  A suitable vacancy could not be found for him after his father's death, and his last day of service was VJ-Day.  Franklin Roosevelt also appointed his son James Roosevelt as administrative assistant to the president and secretary to the president.  James Roosevelt was the White House coordinator for 18 federal agencies.  Time magazine suggested that James Roosevelt might be considered "Assistant President of the United States".

John F. Kennedy made his brother-in-law, Sargent Shriver, the first director of the Peace Corps and his brother, Robert F. Kennedy, Attorney General.

President Richard Nixon appointed John Eisenhower as United States Ambassador to Belgium.  Richard Nixon was the father to Eisenhower's daughter-in-law.

In 1979, Bill Clinton, within weeks of being newly elected as Governor of Arkansas, appointed his wife Hillary to chair of the Rural Health Advisory Committee. In 1993, newly elected as President of the United States, he again appointed his wife to chair a Task Force on National Health Care Reform. In 2013, Bill appointed his daughter Chelsea a member of the governing board of the Clinton Foundation and Clinton Global Initiative.

In 2017, President Donald Trump was accused of nepotism after appointing both his son-in-law Jared Kushner and his daughter Ivanka (married to Kushner) into advisory roles to the president. In 2020, President Trump appointed his son Eric Trump's brother-in-law, Kyle Yunaska, to the position of NASA Deputy Chief of Staff. Yunaska holds a 2009 MBA and a 2007 Bachelor of Science in Management and Physics, both from East Carolina University. Yunaska was a paid government employee.

Legality
Current (since 1995) U.S. court rulings have held that the White House itself does not constitute an "agency" for the purposes of adhering to existing anti-nepotism laws on the books.

Venezuela 
Nepotism is known to be practiced by President of the Venezuela National Assembly, Cilia Flores. Nine positions in the National Assembly were filled by Flores' family members, including a mother-in-law, aunt, three siblings, a cousin and her mother, and two nephews.

Zimbabwe 
The late Robert Mugabe was reported to be preparing his wife Grace Mugabe to be the next president of Zimbabwe while he was president. Vice President Joice Mujuru was previously considered to be the favored successor to Mugabe.

Types of partiality 
Nepotism refers to partiality to family whereas cronyism refers to partiality to an associate or friend. Favoritism, the broadest of the terms, refers to partiality based upon being part of a favored group, rather than job performance.

See also

References

Further reading 
"American Calendar" in American Quarterly 25.4 (October 1973): 493–96.
 Cardinal Giovanni Battista De Luca: Nepotism in the Seventeenth-century Catholic Church and De Luca's Efforts to Prohibit the Practice University of North Texas Digital Library.
"Nepotism: is it back?" New Statesman, 29 September 2003.
 Nepotism in Organizations, 2012

External links 

 Hollywoodnepotism.net
Booknotes interview with Adam Bellow on In Praise of Nepotism: A Natural History, 24 August 2003.

 
Group processes
Pejorative terms for forms of government